Xiangli may refer to the following places in China:

Xiangli, Guangxi (湘漓), a town in Xing'an County, Guangxi
Xiangli Subdistrict (项里街道), a subdistrict in Sucheng District, Suqian, Jiangsu

See also
Xiang Li (disambiguation)